Trichomycterus aguarague is a species of pencil catfish endemic to Bolivia, where it occurs in the Paraná river system in Aguaragüe National Park. This species reaches a maximum length of  SL.

References

External links

aguarague
Fish described in 2006
Catfish of South America
Fish of Bolivia
Endemic fauna of Bolivia